Kamiyama (written: 神山 lit. "god mountain" or 上山 lit. "upper mountain") is a Japanese surname. Notable people with the surname include:

, Japanese musician
, Japanese Governor-General of Taiwan
, Japanese anime director
, Japanese businessman
, Japanese model and beauty pageant winner
, Japanese footballer
, Japanese singer
, Japanese communist
Takashi Kamiyama (born 1973), Japanese golfer
, Japanese actor, television personality and idol

Japanese-language surnames